The Randolph Hotel or Hotel Randolph is a nine-story hotel located in Des Moines, Iowa, United States. This hotel was designed and built by the H.L. Stevens & Company in 1911.  It rents rooms for a weekly rate. Most guests are considered long term, meaning they stay for more than thirty consecutive days. The Randolph Hotel is located on the corner of Fourth Street and Court Avenue downtown, along the historic Court Avenue strip.

It is an eight-story hotel "constructed in 1912 as the first tall and only 'absolutely fireproof hotel' in the city" of Des Moines, Iowa. Ironically there was a fire on 2-19-2010. It is located at 200-204 4th Street in the downtown commercial district of Des Moines.

The property was added to the National Register of Historic Places (NRHP) on June 11, 2009, and the listing was announced as the featured listing in the National Park Service's weekly list of June 19, 2009.

In 2008, rehabilitation of the building into low- and moderate-income rental housing, to be funded in part by federal and state historic preservation tax credits, was planned.

References

Buildings and structures in Des Moines, Iowa
Economy of Des Moines, Iowa
Hotels in Iowa
Hotel buildings completed in 1912
Hotel buildings on the National Register of Historic Places in Iowa
National Register of Historic Places in Des Moines, Iowa
1912 establishments in Iowa